Yale is a university in the United States.

Yale may also refer to:

Businesses and organisations

Companies and products
Yale (company), a lock manufacturer
Yale (automobile), by the Kirk Manufacturing Company, 1901–1905
Yale (1916 automobile), by the Saginaw Motor Company, 1916-1918
, an American car manufacturer in New Haven, Connecticut, 1898–1902
, an American motorcycle company, 1902
RapidMiner, formerly YALE, date science software
Yale Materials Handling Corporation, a forklift manufacturer

Education
Yale College, Wrexham, Wales
Yale Secondary School, Abbotsford, British Columbia, Canada
Yale University, New Haven, Connecticut, U.S.
Yale College, the undergraduate college of Yale University

People
Yale (surname), including a list of people with the name
Yale (journalist), nickname of the Spanish journalist Felipe Navarro García (1930–1994)

Places

Canada
Yale, British Columbia
Yale (electoral district), defunct
Yale (provincial electoral district)
Yale District, a defunct federal electoral district 
Yale-North

United Kingdom
 Ial or Yale, a commote of medieval Wales

United States
Yale, Illinois
Yale, Iowa
Yale, Kansas
Yale, Michigan
Yale Airport
Yale, Mississippi
Yale, Ohio
Yale, Oklahoma
Yale, South Dakota
Yale, Virginia
Yale, Washington
Yale Township, Valley County, Nebraska
Yale Building, in Chicago, Illinois
Yale Glacier, in Alaska
Yale Lake, in Washington
Yale Dam
Yale Park
Yale station, in Denver, Colorado
Lake Yale, in Florida
Mount Yale, in the Rocky Mountains

Sports
Club Atletico Yale, a basketball club from Uruguay
Yale Atlético Clube, a former Brazilian sports club
Yale Bulldogs, College sport teams representing Yale University

Transportation and military
North American NA-64 Yale, a World War II training aircraft
, the name of several steamships
, the name of several ships of the U.S. Navy

Other uses
Yale (typeface), commissioned by Yale University
Yale (mythical creature), a creature in European mythology
Yalë language, a Papuan language

See also

Yale school, an influential group of thinkers